This is a list of bird species confirmed in the Canadian territory of Northwest Territories. Unless otherwise noted, the list is that of Bird Checklists of the World as of March 2021. Of the 296 species on the list, 61 are accidental and four were introduced to North America. One species is extinct and another probably is.

This list is presented in the taxonomic sequence of the Check-list of North and Middle American Birds, 7th edition through the 62nd Supplement, published by the American Ornithological Society (AOS). Common and scientific names are also those of the Check-list, except that Canadian English spellings are used and the common names of families are from the Clements taxonomy because the AOS list does not include them.

The following tags are used to categorise some species:

 (A) Accidental - a species that rarely or accidentally occurs in Northwest Territories
 (I) Introduced - a species introduced to Northwest Territories as a consequence, direct or indirect, of human actions

Ducks, geese, and waterfowl
Order: AnseriformesFamily: Anatidae

Anatidae includes the ducks and most duck-like waterfowl, such as geese and swans. These birds are adapted to an aquatic existence with webbed feet, bills which are flattened to a greater or lesser extent, and feathers that are excellent at shedding water due to special oils.

Snow goose, Anser caerulescens
Ross's goose, Anser rossii
Greater white-fronted goose, Anser albifrons
Brant, Branta bernicla
Cackling goose, Branta hutchinsii
Canada goose, Branta canadensis
Trumpeter swan, Cygnus buccinator
Tundra swan, Cygnus columbianus
Blue-winged teal, Spatula discors
Cinnamon teal, Spatula cyanoptera (A)
Northern shoveler, Spatula clypeata
Gadwall, Mareca strepera
Eurasian wigeon, Mareca penelope (A)
American wigeon, Mareca americana
Mallard, Anas platyrhynchos
American black duck, Anas rubripes (A)
Northern pintail, Anas acuta
Green-winged teal, Anas crecca
Canvasback, Aythya valisineria
Redhead, Aythya americana
Ring-necked duck, Aythya collaris
Greater scaup, Aythya marila
Lesser scaup, Aythya affinis
King eider, Somateria spectabilis
Common eider, Somateria mollissima
Harlequin duck, Histrionicus histrionicus
Surf scoter, Melanitta perspicillata
White-winged scoter, Melanitta deglandi
Common scoter, Melanitta nigra (A)
Black scoter, Melanitta americana
Long-tailed duck, Clangula hyemalis
Bufflehead, Bucephala albeola
Common goldeneye, Bucephala clangula
Barrow's goldeneye, Bucephala islandica
Hooded merganser, Lophodytes cucullatus
Common merganser, Mergus merganser
Red-breasted merganser, Mergus serrator
Ruddy duck, Oxyura jamaicensis

Pheasants, grouse, and allies
Order: GalliformesFamily: Phasianidae

Phasianidae consists of the pheasants and their allies. These are terrestrial species, variable in size but generally plump with broad relatively short wings. Many species are gamebirds or have been domesticated as a food source for humans.

Ruffed grouse, Bonasa umbellus
Spruce grouse, Canachites canadensis
Willow ptarmigan, Lagopus lagopus
Rock ptarmigan, Lagopus mutus
White-tailed ptarmigan, Lagopus leucurus
Dusky grouse, Dendragapus obscurus
Sharp-tailed grouse, Tympanuchus phasianellus

Grebes
Order: PodicipediformesFamily: Podicipedidae

Grebes are small to medium-large freshwater diving birds. They have lobed toes and are excellent swimmers and divers. However, they have their feet placed far back on the body, making them quite ungainly on land.

Pied-billed grebe, Podilymbus podiceps
Horned grebe, Podiceps auritus
Red-necked grebe, Podiceps grisegena
Eared grebe, Podiceps nigricollis

Pigeons and doves
Order: ColumbiformesFamily: Columbidae

Pigeons and doves are stout-bodied birds with short necks and short slender bills with a fleshy cere. They feed on seeds, fruit and plants. Unlike most other birds, the doves and pigeons produce "crop milk," which is secreted by a sloughing of fluid-filled cells from the lining of the crop. Both sexes produce this highly nutritious substance to feed to the young.

Rock pigeon, Columba livia (I) (A)
Eurasian collared-dove, Streptopelia decaocto (I) (A)
Passenger pigeon, Ectopistes migratorius (extinct)
White-winged dove, Zenaida asiatica (A)
Mourning dove, Zenaida macroura

Nightjars and allies
Order: CaprimulgiformesFamily: Caprimulgidae

Nightjars are medium-sized nocturnal birds that usually nest on the ground. They have long wings, short legs, and very short bills. Most have small feet, of little use for walking, and long pointed wings. Their soft plumage is cryptically coloured to resemble bark or leaves.

Common nighthawk,  Chordeiles minor

Hummingbirds
Order: ApodiformesFamily: Trochilidae

Hummingbirds are small birds capable of hovering in mid-air due to the rapid flapping of their wings. They are the only birds that can fly backwards.

Ruby-throated hummingbird, Archilochus colubris (A)
Calliope hummingbird, Selasphorus calliope (A)
Rufous hummingbird, Selasphorus rufus (A)

Rails, gallinules, and coots
Order: GruiformesFamily: Rallidae

Rallidae is a large family of small to medium-sized birds which includes the rails, crakes, coots, and gallinules. The most typical family members occupy dense vegetation in damp environments near lakes, swamps, or rivers. In general they are shy and secretive birds, making them difficult to observe. Most species have strong legs and long toes which are well adapted to soft uneven surfaces. They tend to have short, rounded wings and to be weak fliers.

Sora, Porzana carolina
American coot, Fulica americana
Yellow rail, Coturnicops noveboracensis

Cranes
Order: GruiformesFamily: Gruidae

Cranes are large, long-legged and long-necked birds. Unlike the similar-looking but unrelated herons, cranes fly with necks outstretched, not pulled back. Most have elaborate and noisy courting displays or "dances".

Sandhill crane, Antigone canadensis
Whooping crane, Grus americana

Stilts and avocets
Order: CharadriiformesFamily: Recurvirostridae

Recurvirostridae is a family of large wading birds which includes the avocets and stilts. The avocets have long legs and long up-curved bills. The stilts have extremely long legs and long, thin, straight bills.

American avocet, Recurvirostra americana

Plovers and lapwings
Order: CharadriiformesFamily: Charadriidae

The family Charadriidae includes the plovers, dotterels, and lapwings. They are small to medium-sized birds with compact bodies, short thick necks, and long, usually pointed, wings. They are found in open country worldwide, mostly in habitats near water.

Black-bellied plover, Pluvialis squatarola
American golden-plover, Pluvialis dominica
Pacific golden-plover, Pluvialis fulva (A)
Killdeer, Charadrius vociferus
Semipalmated plover, Charadrius semipalmatus

Sandpipers and allies
Order: CharadriiformesFamily: Scolopacidae

Scolopacidae is a large diverse family of small to medium-sized shorebirds including the sandpipers, curlews, godwits, shanks, tattlers, woodcocks, snipes, dowitchers, and phalaropes. The majority of these species eat small invertebrates picked out of the mud or soil. Different lengths of legs and bills enable multiple species to feed in the same habitat, particularly on the coast, without direct competition for food.

Upland sandpiper, Bartramia longicauda
Whimbrel, Numenius phaeopus
Eskimo curlew, Numenius borealis (A) (possibly extinct)
Long-billed curlew, Numenius americanus (A)
Bar-tailed godwit, Limosa lapponica (A)
Hudsonian godwit, Limosa haemastica
Ruddy turnstone, Arenaria interpres
Black turnstone, Arenaria melanocephala
Red knot, Calidris canutus
Surfbird, Calidris virgata (A)
Stilt sandpiper, Calidris himantopus
Sanderling, Calidris alba
Dunlin, Calidris alpina
Purple sandpiper, Calidris maritima
Baird's sandpiper, Calidris bairdii
Least sandpiper, Calidris minutilla
White-rumped sandpiper, Calidris fuscicollis 
Buff-breasted sandpiper, Calidris subruficollis (A)
Pectoral sandpiper, Calidris melanotos
Semipalmated sandpiper, Calidris pusilla
Western sandpiper, Calidris mauri (A)
Short-billed dowitcher, Limnodromus griseus
Wilson's snipe, Gallinago delicata
Spotted sandpiper, Actitis macularia
Solitary sandpiper, Tringa solitaria
Wandering tattler, Tringa incana
Lesser yellowlegs, Tringa flavipes
Willet, Tringa semipalmata (A)
Greater yellowlegs, Tringa melanoleuca
Wilson's phalarope, Phalaropus tricolor
Red-necked phalarope, Phalaropus lobatus
Red phalarope, Phalaropus fulicarius

Skuas and jaegers
Order: CharadriiformesFamily: Stercorariidae

Skuas and jaegers are in general medium to large birds, typically with grey or brown plumage, often with white markings on the wings. They have longish bills with hooked tips and webbed feet with sharp claws. They look like large dark gulls, but have a fleshy cere above the upper mandible. They are strong, acrobatic fliers.

Pomarine jaeger, Stercorarius pomarinus
Parasitic jaeger, Stercorarius parasiticus
Long-tailed jaeger, Stercorarius longicaudus

Auks, murres, and puffins
Order: CharadriiformesFamily: Alcidae

Alcids are superficially similar to penguins due to their black-and-white colours, their upright posture, and some of their habits, however they are only distantly related to the penguins and are able to fly. Auks live on the open sea, only deliberately coming ashore to nest.

Common murre, Uria aalge (A)
Thick-billed murre, Uria lomvia
Black guillemot, Cepphus grylle

Gulls, terns, and skimmers
Order: CharadriiformesFamily: Laridae

Laridae is a family of medium to large seabirds and includes gulls, terns, kittiwakes, and skimmers. They are typically grey or white, often with black markings on the head or wings. They have stout, longish bills and webbed feet.

Black-legged kittiwake, Rissa tridactyla
Ivory gull, Pagophila eburnea
Sabine's gull, Xema sabini
Bonaparte's gull, Chroicocephalus philadelphia
Black-headed gull, Chroicocephalus ridibundus (A)
Franklin's gull, Leucophaeus pipixcan
Black-tailed gull, Larus crassirostris (A)
Short-billed gull, Larus brachyrhynchus
Ring-billed gull, Larus delawarensis
California gull, Larus californicus
Herring gull, Larus argentatus
Iceland gull, Larus glaucoides
Lesser black-backed gull, Larus fuscus (A)
Slaty-backed gull, Larus schistisagus (A)
Glaucous-winged gull, Larus glaucescens (A)
Glaucous gull, Larus hyperboreus
Caspian tern, Hydroprogne caspia
Black tern, Chlidonias niger
Common tern, Sterna hirundo
Arctic tern, Sterna paradisaea

Loons
Order: GaviiformesFamily: Gaviidae

Loons are aquatic birds, the size of a large duck, to which they are unrelated. Their plumage is largely grey or black, and they have spear-shaped bills. Loons swim well and fly adequately, but are almost hopeless on land, because their legs are placed towards the rear of the body.

Red-throated loon, Gavia stellata
Pacific loon, Gavia pacifica
Common loon, Gavia immer
Yellow-billed loon, Gavia adamsii

Shearwaters and petrels
Order: ProcellariiformesFamily: Procellariidae

The procellariids are the main group of medium-sized "true petrels", characterized by united nostrils with medium septum and a long outer functional primary.

Northern fulmar, Fulmarus glacialis (A)
Short-tailed shearwater, Ardenna tenuirostris (A)

Boobies and gannets
Order: SuliformesFamily: Sulidae

The sulids comprise the gannets and boobies. Both groups are medium-large coastal seabirds that plunge-dive for fish.

Northern gannet, Morus bassanus

Cormorants and shags
Order: SuliformesFamily: Phalacrocoracidae

Cormorants are medium-to-large aquatic birds, usually with mainly dark plumage and areas of coloured skin on the face. The bill is long, thin, and sharply hooked. Their feet are four-toed and webbed.

Double-crested cormorant, Nannopterum auritum (A)

Pelicans
Order: PelecaniformesFamily: Pelecanidae

Pelicans are very large water birds with a distinctive pouch under their beak. Like other birds in the order Pelecaniformes, they have four webbed toes.

American white pelican, Pelecanus erythrorhynchos

Herons, egrets, and bitterns
Order: PelecaniformesFamily: Ardeidae

The family Ardeidae contains the herons, egrets, and bitterns. Herons and egrets are medium to large wading birds with long necks and legs. Bitterns tend to be shorter necked and more secretive. Members of Ardeidae fly with their necks retracted, unlike other long-necked birds such as storks, ibises, and spoonbills.

American bittern, Botaurus lentiginosus (A)
Great blue heron, Ardea herodias (A)
Great egret, Ardea alba (A)
Snowy egret, Egretta thula (A)
Cattle egret, Bubulcus ibis (A)

New World vultures
Order: CathartiformesFamily: Cathartidae

The New World vultures are not closely related to Old World vultures, but superficially resemble them because of convergent evolution. Like the Old World vultures, they are scavengers. However, unlike Old World vultures, which find carcasses by sight, New World vultures have a good sense of smell with which they locate carcasses.

Turkey vulture, Cathartes aura (A)

Osprey
Order: AccipitriformesFamily: Pandionidae

Pandionidae is a family of fish-eating birds of prey possessing a very large, powerful hooked beak for tearing flesh from their prey, strong legs, powerful talons, and keen eyesight. The family is monotypic.

Osprey, Pandion haliaetus

Hawks, eagles, and kites
Order: AccipitriformesFamily: Accipitridae

Accipitridae is a family of birds of prey which includes hawks, eagles, kites, harriers, and Old World vultures. These birds have very large powerful hooked beaks for tearing flesh from their prey, strong legs, powerful talons, and keen eyesight.

Golden eagle, Aquila chrysaetos
Northern harrier, Circus hudsonius
Sharp-shinned hawk, Accipiter striatus
Cooper's hawk, Accipiter cooperii (A)
Northern goshawk, Accipiter gentilis
Bald eagle, Haliaeetus leucocephalus
Broad-winged hawk, Buteo platypterus (A)
Swainson's hawk, Buteo swainsoni
Red-tailed hawk, Buteo jamaicensis
Rough-legged hawk, Buteo lagopus

Owls
Order: StrigiformesFamily: Strigidae

Typical owls are small to large solitary nocturnal birds of prey. They have large forward-facing eyes and ears, a hawk-like beak, and a conspicuous circle of feathers around each eye called a facial disk.

Great horned owl, Bubo virginianus
Snowy owl, Bubo scandiacus
Northern hawk owl, Surnia ulula
Barred owl, Strix varia
Great grey owl, Strix nebulosa
Long-eared owl, Asio otus (A)
Short-eared owl, Asio flammeus
Boreal owl, Aegolius funereus
Northern saw-whet owl, Aegolius acadicus (A)

Kingfishers
Order: CoraciiformesFamily: Alcedinidae

Kingfishers are medium-sized birds with large heads, long pointed bills, short legs, and stubby tails.

Belted kingfisher, Megaceryle alcyon

Woodpeckers
Order: PiciformesFamily: Picidae

Woodpeckers are small to medium-sized birds with chisel-like beaks, short legs, stiff tails, and long tongues used for capturing insects. Some species have feet with two toes pointing forward and two backward, while several species have only three toes. Many woodpeckers have the habit of tapping noisily on tree trunks with their beaks.

Yellow-bellied sapsucker, Sphyrapicus varius
American three-toed woodpecker, Picoides dorsalis
Black-backed woodpecker, Picoides arcticus
Downy woodpecker, Dryobates pubescens
Hairy woodpecker, Dryobates villosus
Northern flicker, Colaptes auratus
Pileated woodpecker, Dryocopus pileatus

Falcons and caracaras
Order: FalconiformesFamily: Falconidae

Falconidae is a family of diurnal birds of prey, notably the falcons and caracaras. They differ from hawks, eagles, and kites in that they kill with their beaks instead of their talons.

American kestrel, Falco sparverius
Merlin, Falco columbarius
Gyrfalcon, Falco rusticolus
Peregrine falcon, Falco peregrinus

Tyrant flycatchers
Order: PasseriformesFamily: Tyrannidae

Tyrant flycatchers are Passerine birds which occur throughout North and South America. They superficially resemble the Old World flycatchers, but are more robust and have stronger bills. They do not have the sophisticated vocal capabilities of the songbirds. Most, but not all, are rather plain. As the name implies, most are insectivorous.

Ash-throated flycatcher, Myiarchus cinerascens (A)
Great crested flycatcher, Myiarchus crinitus (A)
Western kingbird, Tyrannus verticalis (A)
Eastern kingbird, Tyrannus tyrannus
Olive-sided flycatcher, Contopus cooperi
Western wood-pewee, Contopus sordidulus
Yellow-bellied flycatcher, Empidonax flaviventris
Alder flycatcher, Empidonax alnorum
Least flycatcher, Empidonax minimus
Hammond's flycatcher, Empidonax hammondii (A)
Dusky flycatcher, Empidonax oberholseri (A)
Eastern phoebe, Sayornis phoebe
Say's phoebe, Sayornis saya

Vireos, shrike-babblers, and erpornis
Order: PasseriformesFamily: Vireonidae

The vireos are a group of small to medium-sized passerine birds mostly restricted to the New World, though a few other members of the family are found in Asia. They are typically greenish in colour and resemble wood warblers apart from their heavier bills.

Blue-headed vireo, Vireo solitarius
Philadelphia vireo, Vireo philadelphicus
Warbling vireo, Vireo gilvus
Red-eyed vireo, Vireo olivaceus

Shrikes
Order: PasseriformesFamily: Laniidae

Shrikes are passerine birds known for their habit of catching other birds and small animals and impaling the uneaten portions of their bodies on thorns. A shrike's beak is hooked, like that of a typical bird of prey.

Northern shrike, Lanius borealis

Crows, jays, and magpies
Order: PasseriformesFamily: Corvidae

The family Corvidae includes crows, ravens, jays, choughs, magpies, treepies, nutcrackers, and ground jays. Corvids are above average in size among the Passeriformes, and some of the larger species show high levels of intelligence.

Canada jay, Perisoreus canadensis
Blue jay, Cyanocitta cristata (A)
Black-billed magpie, Pica hudsonia
American crow, Corvus brachyrhynchos
Common raven, Corvus corax

Tits, chickadees, and titmice
Order: PasseriformesFamily: Paridae

The Paridae are mainly small stocky woodland species with short stout bills. Some have crests. They are adaptable birds, with a mixed diet including seeds and insects.

Black-capped chickadee, Poecile atricapilla
Boreal chickadee, Poecile hudsonica
Grey-headed chickadee, Poecile cincta

Larks
Order: PasseriformesFamily: Alaudidae

Larks are small terrestrial birds with often extravagant songs and display flights. Most larks are fairly dull in appearance. Their food is insects and seeds.

Horned lark, Eremophila alpestris

Swallows
Order: PasseriformesFamily: Hirundinidae

The family Hirundinidae is adapted to aerial feeding. They have a slender streamlined body, long pointed wings, and a short bill with a wide gape. The feet are adapted to perching rather than walking, and the front toes are partially joined at the base.

Bank swallow, Riparia riparia
Tree swallow, Tachycineta bicolor
Violet-green swallow, Tachycineta thalassina
Barn swallow, Hirundo rustica
Cliff swallow, Petrochelidon pyrrhonota

Leaf warblers
Order: PasseriformesFamily: Phylloscopidae

Leaf warblers are a family of small insectivorous birds found mostly in Eurasia and ranging into Wallacea and Africa. The Arctic warbler breeds east into Alaska. The species are of various sizes, often green-plumaged above and yellow below, or more subdued with greyish-green to greyish-brown colours.

Kamchatka leaf warbler, Phylloscopus examinandus (A)

Kinglets
Order: PasseriformesFamily: Regulidae

The kinglets are a small family of birds which resemble the titmice. They are very small insectivorous birds in the genus Regulus. The adults have coloured crowns, giving rise to their name.

Ruby-crowned kinglet, Corthylio calendula
Golden-crowned kinglet, Regulus satrapa

Waxwings
Order: PasseriformesFamily: Bombycillidae

The waxwings are a group of passerine birds with soft silky plumage and unique red tips to some of the wing feathers. In the Bohemian and cedar waxwings, these tips look like sealing wax and give the group its name. These are arboreal birds of northern forests. They live on insects in summer and berries in winter.

Bohemian waxwing, Bombycilla garrulus
Cedar waxwing, Bombycilla cedrorum

Nuthatches
Order: PasseriformesFamily: Sittidae

Nuthatches are small woodland birds. They have the unusual ability to climb down trees head first, unlike other birds which can only go upwards. Nuthatches have big heads, short tails and powerful bills and feet.

Red-breasted nuthatch, Sitta canadensis

Treecreepers
Order: PasseriformesFamily: Certhiidae

Treecreepers are small woodland birds, brown above and white below. They have thin pointed down-curved bills, which they use to extricate insects from bark. They have stiff tail feathers, like woodpeckers, which they use to support themselves on vertical trees.

Brown creeper, Certhia americana (A)

Wrens
Order: PasseriformesFamily: Troglodytidae

Wrens are small and inconspicuous birds, except for their loud songs. They have short wings and thin down-turned bills. Several species often hold their tails upright. All are insectivorous.

Winter wren, Troglodytes hiemalis
Marsh wren, Cistothorus palustris

Mockingbirds and thrashers
Order: PasseriformesFamily: Mimidae

The mimids are a family of passerine birds which includes thrashers, mockingbirds, tremblers, and the New World catbirds. These birds are notable for their vocalization, especially their remarkable ability to mimic a wide variety of birds and other sounds heard outdoors. The species tend towards dull greys and browns in their appearance.

Grey catbird, Dumetella carolinensis (A)
Northern mockingbird, Mimus polyglottos (A)

Starlings
Order: PasseriformesFamily: Sturnidae

Starlings and mynas are small to medium-sized Old World passerine birds with strong feet. Their flight is strong and direct and most are very gregarious. Their preferred habitat is fairly open country, and they eat insects and fruit. The plumage of several species is dark with a metallic sheen.

European starling, Sturnus vulgaris (I)

Dippers
Order: PasseriformesFamily: Cinclidae

Dippers are a group of perching birds whose habitat includes aquatic environments in the Americas, Europe, and Asia. They are named for their bobbing or dipping movements. These birds have adaptations which allows them to submerge and walk on the bottom to feed on insect larvae.

American dipper, Cinclus mexicanus (A)

Thrushes and allies
Order: PasseriformesFamily: Turdidae

The thrushes are a group of passerine birds that occur mainly but not exclusively in the Old World. They are plump, soft plumaged, small to medium-sized insectivores or sometimes omnivores, often feeding on the ground. Many have attractive songs.

Mountain bluebird, Sialia currucoides
Townsend's solitaire, Myadestes townsendi
Grey-cheeked thrush, Catharus minimus
Swainson's thrush, Catharus ustulatus
Hermit thrush, Catharus guttatus
American robin, Turdus migratorius
Varied thrush, Ixoreus naevius

Old World flycatchers
Order: PasseriformesFamily: Muscicapidae

The Old World flycatchers are a large family of small passerine birds. These are mainly small arboreal insectivores, many of which, as the name implies, take their prey on the wing.

Northern wheatear, Oenanthe oenanthe

Old World sparrows
Order: PasseriformesFamily: Passeridae

Old World sparrows are small passerine birds. In general, sparrows tend to be small plump brownish or greyish birds with short tails and short powerful beaks. Sparrows are seed eaters, but they also consume small insects.

House sparrow, Passer domesticus (I)

Wagtails and pipits
Order: PasseriformesFamily: Motacillidae

Motacillidae is a family of small passerine birds with medium to long tails. They include the wagtails, longclaws and pipits. They are slender ground-feeding insectivores of open country.

Eastern yellow wagtail, Motacilla tschutschensis (A)
Grey wagtail, Motacilla cinerea (A)
American pipit, Anthus rubescens

Finches, euphonias, and allies
Order: PasseriformesFamily: Fringillidae

Finches are seed-eating passerine birds, that are small to moderately large and have a strong beak, usually conical and in some species very large. All have twelve tail feathers and nine primaries. These birds have a bouncing flight with alternating bouts of flapping and gliding on closed wings, and most sing well.

Evening grosbeak, Coccothraustes vespertinus
Pine grosbeak, Pinicola enucleator
Grey-crowned rosy-finch, Leucosticte tephrocotis
House finch, Haemorhous mexicanus (A)
Purple finch, Haemorhous purpureus
Common redpoll, Acanthis flammea
Hoary redpoll, Acanthis hornemanni
Red crossbill, Loxia curvirostra
White-winged crossbill, Loxia leucoptera
Pine siskin, Spinus pinus
American goldfinch, Spinus tristis (A)

Longspurs and snow buntings
Order: PasseriformesFamily: Calcariidae

The Calcariidae are a group of passerine birds that were traditionally grouped with the New World sparrows, but differ in a number of respects and are usually found in open grassy areas.

Lapland longspur, Calcarius lapponicus
Smith's longspur, Calcarius pictus
Snow bunting, Plectrophenax nivalis

New World sparrows
Order: PasseriformesFamily: Passerellidae

Until 2017, these species were considered part of the family Emberizidae. Most of the species are known as sparrows, but these birds are not closely related to the Old World sparrows which are in the family Passeridae. Many of these have distinctive head patterns.

Lark sparrow, Chondestes grammacus (A)
Chipping sparrow, Spizella passerina
Clay-coloured sparrow, Spizella pallida
Fox sparrow, Passerella iliaca
American tree sparrow, Spizelloides arborea
Dark-eyed junco, Junco hyemalis
White-crowned sparrow, Zonotrichia leucophrys
Golden-crowned sparrow, Zonotrichia atricapilla
Harris's sparrow, Zonotrichia querula
White-throated sparrow, Zonotrichia albicollis
Vesper sparrow, Pooecetes gramineus
LeConte's sparrow, Ammospiza leconteii
Nelson's sparrow, Ammospiza nelsoni
Savannah sparrow, Passerculus sandwichensis
Song sparrow, Melospiza melodia
Lincoln's sparrow, Melospiza lincolnii
Swamp sparrow, Melospiza georgiana

Troupials and allies
Order: PasseriformesFamily: Icteridae

The icterids are a group of small to medium-sized, often colourful passerine birds restricted to the New World and include the grackles, New World blackbirds, and New World orioles. Most species have black as a predominant plumage colour, often enlivened by yellow, orange, or red.

Yellow-headed blackbird, Xanthocephalus xanthocephalus
Bobolink, Dolichonyx oryzivorus (A)
Western meadowlark, Sturnella neglecta (A)
Baltimore oriole, Icterus galbula (A)
Red-winged blackbird, Agelaius phoeniceus
Brown-headed cowbird, Molothrus ater
Rusty blackbird, Euphagus carolinus
Brewer's blackbird, Euphagus cyanocephalus
Common grackle, Quiscalus quiscula

New World warblers
Order: PasseriformesFamily: Parulidae

The wood-warblers are a group of small, often colourful, passerine birds restricted to the New World. Most are arboreal, but some are more terrestrial. Most members of this family are insectivores.

Ovenbird, Seiurus aurocapilla
Northern waterthrush, Parkesia noveboracensis
Black-and-white warbler, Mniotilta varia
Tennessee warbler, Leiothlypis peregrina
Orange-crowned warbler, Leiothlypis celata
Connecticut warbler, Oporornis agilis (A)
Mourning warbler, Geothlypis philadelphia
Common yellowthroat, Geothlypis trichas
American redstart, Setophaga ruticilla
Cape May warbler, Setophaga tigrina
Magnolia warbler, Setophaga magnolia
Bay-breasted warbler, Setophaga castanea
Yellow warbler, Setophaga petechia
Blackpoll warbler, Setophaga striata
Palm warbler, Setophaga palmarum
Yellow-rumped warbler, Setophaga coronata
Townsend's warbler, Setophaga townsendi (A)
Black-throated green warbler, Setophaga virens (A)
Canada warbler, Cardellina canadensis
Wilson's warbler, Cardellina pusilla

Cardinals and allies
Order: PasseriformesFamily: Cardinalidae

The cardinals are a family of robust, seed-eating birds with strong bills. They are typically associated with open woodland. The sexes usually have distinct plumages.

Western tanager, Piranga ludoviciana
Rose-breasted grosbeak, Pheucticus ludovicianus
Lazuli bunting, Passerina amoena (A)
Indigo bunting, Passerina cyanea
Dickcissel, Spiza americana (A)

Notes

References

See also
List of birds
Lists of birds by region

Northwest Territories
Birds